Hermann Schubert (born 10 July 1964) is a German economist and historian of economics.

Career 
Born in Munich, Schubert studied economics at the Ludwig Maximilian University of Munich ( LMU) from 1988 to 1994 and obtained his doctorate at the Faculty of Economics of the LMU in 2008 after a two-year doctoral program at the School for Advanced Studies in the Social Sciences (EHESS) in Paris. Since 2011 he holds a professorship in economics and since 2016 at the International School of Management in Stuttgart. Schubert's main research interests are capital market oriented macroeconomics, income and wealth distribution and the history of economics.

References

External links 
 

1964 births
Living people
People from Munich
German economists
School for Advanced Studies in the Social Sciences alumni